The 1973 Detroit Lions season was their 44th in the league. Don McCafferty, who served as an assistant under Don Shula during Shula's stint as head coach of the Baltimore Colts, and who as head coach himself coached the Colts to a Super Bowl V victory over the Dallas Cowboys, would replace Joe Schmidt as head coach. However, the team would still fail to improve on their previous season's output of 8–5–1, finishing a mediocre 6–7–1. The team missed the playoffs for the third straight season.

NFL draft

Notes 

  Detroit traded TE Craig Cotton and its first-round selection (19th) to Chicago in exchange for Chicago's first- and third-round selections (17th and 58th).
  Detroit traded DB Al Clark to Los Angeles in exchange for the Rams' third-round selection (75th).
  Detroit traded its second-round selection in 1972 to Atlanta in exchange for CB Rudy Redmond, RB Sonny Campbell and Atlanta's fourth-round selection (91st).
  Detroit traded its fifth-round selection (123rd) to Washington in exchange for TE John Hilton.
  Detroit traded its sixth-round selection (148th) to St. Louis in exchange for LB Rick Ogle.
  Detroit traded DT Jerry Rush to Cleveland in exchange for the Browns' eighth-round pick (203rd).

Roster

Schedule

Note: Intra-division opponents are in bold text.

Season summary

Week 1

Week 14

Standings

References

Detroit Lions seasons
Detroit Lions
Detroit Lions